HMS Resolution was a 74-gun third-rate ship of the line of the Royal Navy, launched on 14 December 1758 at Northam.

On 20 November the following year, Resolution took part in the decisive Battle of Quiberon Bay captained by Henry Speke. However, after a stormy night she was found the following morning to have run aground on the Four Shoal and dismasted.

Notes

References

 Lavery, Brian (2003) The Ship of the Line – Volume 1: The development of the battlefleet 1650–1850. Conway Maritime Press. .

External links
 

Ships of the line of the Royal Navy
Dublin-class ships of the line
1758 ships
Maritime incidents in 1759